Paul Swarbrick (born 2 July 1958) is a Roman Catholic prelate, who has served as Bishop of Lancaster since 2018.

Early life and education
Born on 2 July 1958 at Garstang, Lancashire, England, Swarbrick was educated at Lancaster Royal Grammar School, an all-boys school in Lancashire's county town.

A distant cousin of Mgr Thomas Adamson, he prepared for Holy Orders at Ushaw College, a seminary in County Durham.

Ordained ministry
On 10 July 1982, at the age of 24, he was ordained a priest by Bishop Brian Foley at St Mary and St Michael's Church, Garstang, in the Roman Catholic Diocese of Lancaster.

Swarbrick served as Assistant Priest at St Mary's Church, Kells, Whitehaven (1982–1983), and at St Maria Goretti Church, Preston (1983–1984), before moving to Blackpool, where he served as chaplain to St Mary's Catholic High School and Assistant Priest at St Cuthbert's Church from 1984 to 1990. From 1990 to 2005, he undertook missionary work in the Diocese of Monze, Zambia. Returning to England, he was an assistant priest at Church of St Thomas of Canterbury and the English Martyrs, Preston. Then, he served as parish priest of Sacred Heart, Preston and St Walburge, Preston (2007 to 2010) and of Our Lady and St Michael, Workington (2010 to 2018).

Episcopal ministry
On 12 February 2018, Pope Francis appointed him Bishop of Lancaster, being consecrated on 9 April 2018 by his predecessor, Bishop Michael Campbell.

References

External links

1958 births
Living people
People from Garstang
People educated at Lancaster Royal Grammar School
Alumni of Ushaw College
Roman Catholic bishops of Lancaster
21st-century Roman Catholic bishops in England
English Roman Catholic bishops